Ida Štimac (born 13 May 2000) is a Croatian former alpine skier. She competed in the women's giant slalom at the 2018 Winter Olympics.

References

2000 births
Living people
Croatian female alpine skiers
Olympic alpine skiers of Croatia
Alpine skiers at the 2018 Winter Olympics
Place of birth missing (living people)